John Hodgson (1799 – 2 August 1860) was an Australian politician, member of the Victorian Legislative Council and Mayor of Melbourne 1853–54. He died at his house in Kew of bronchitis.

Arrival in Melbourne
According to his great, great grand daughter, Hodgson was born at Studley, Wadworth, Yorkshire in 1799 to William and Mary Hodgson. The Re-member database puts his birthplace in the small west Yorkshire village of Wadsworth.

Studley in Wadworth, and therefore its use in Melbourne, probably draws on the now World Heritage site of Studley Royal Park Yorkshire, famous for the gardens developed over a hundred years from 1716 by the Aislabie family. The gardens were a popular tourist destination during the 19th century.

The oral source says he and his wife, Annie Buckley Hodgson, with three sons and three daughters arrived in Sydney, Australia in 1837. Later that year they settled in Melbourne.

In 1837 a passenger of the same name is reported travelling from Launceston to Sydney on the wooden paddle steamer James Watt. Image of James Watt. Almost a year later, on the same vessel, a Hodgson is recorded taking passage for Port Phillip.

Business interests

Hodgson became a merchant and speculated in land and in 1840 he took a squatting licence over Studley Park, on Kew's eastern bank of the Yarra River. He built house in Flinders Street and country quarters on the Yarra where he established a punt in 1839; insolvent 1841; grazing interests in Heidelberg district from 1842'.

An early-20th-century report says that in 1837 he bought the land on which the Block Arcade now stands for £23, but that he forfeited the purchase and lost his £2/6/ deposit. In 1839, as the land boom was nearing its bust, he is recorded buying  for just over £1,300. 'The investment of money in land has now become a perfect lottery' said the Argus reporting the sale.

On 11 February 1841 Hodgson became the second person to be registered as insolvent in the Port Phillip district. It appears that like many in the 40s he ran out of cash. By 18 October 1842 he received his Certificate signalling the end of his insolvency.
In 1842 a Mr Curr purchased at a sheriff's sale 'at a great bargain' a house ‘lately the property of Mr Hodgson’ on a ‘pretty little spot on the Yarra.’ In 1843 his Flinders Street properties were sold at auction by the Trustees of the Insolvent Estate.

He clearly solved these early problems.

In 1844, 1845, 1848 1849 and 1850 the Government Gazette reports him taking out a licence to ‘depasture stock, strip bark, and cut timber, (in Bourke) in the district of Port Phillip’. In 1845 he exported 100 tons of bark – probably black wattle bark used for tanning as well as 13 red gum logs. The bark may have been a by-product of land clearing by Hodgson. In 1846 he exported 27 logs on the Glenbervie bound for London. In 1847 he bought two lots of land in Warrnambool for £14 15s.

By 1847 insolvency was well behind him as he was on the ‘Burgess list’ at an address ‘off Little Collins Street’ – probably the Bank Place address he used from then on. One had to meet a number of criteria to be a voter or burgess including owning property worth in excess of £1000.  In 1847 he is listed in the Directory for the Town and District of Port Philip as 'Hodgson John: settler: Studley: Yarra Yarra'. He is on the Port Phillip electoral roll 1848-49 as owning a freehold property 'suburban, near Melbourne'.

We know that he ran a store as one of John T. Smith's political opponents in 1848 said that Smith ‘went through the gradations of shopkeeper and third rate clerk to Mr. John Hodgson’

Another sign of Hodgson's financial strength is that he ran a horse stud. He advertised frequently in the Argus for the services of Euclid and Royal William in 1846 and 1847. The charge was £5 5s. for each mare. The stallions stood at ‘Mr. Hodgson's Paddock, Studley, near Melbourne.’

In 1851 he ran for the City of Melbourne in the inaugural Victorian Legislative Council which means that he met the Candidate criteria. of owning free-hold property worth £5000.

When he stood for election to the first Legislative Council in 1851 the Argus attacked his candidacy commenting on his business interests as follows: it appears that his profession is of such a nature, as to afford ample leisure to attend to anything he takes in hand, and therefore, industry may be added to his list of public virtues. What that profession is, and with what particular interest we may suppose Mr Hodgson likely to be identified, we acknowledge that we are perfectly at a loss to conceive ; and we never yet met any one able to give us the required information ; except one gentleman, who suggested his connexion with the shipping interest, in consequence of his having a punt somewhere on the Yarra.

Hodgson's Punt
The punt ran across the Yarra River near from the foot of what is now Clarke Street, Abbotsford, the exact location being where the remains of the original Johnson Street Bridge are still visible today. The punt can be seen in Nicholas Chevalier's painting 'Studley Park at sunrise' (1861)The painting., also an etching (which was attributed to Chevalier's work) by F. Grosse (1828-1894) and watercolour and gouache (1876) by H. Burn (1807?-1884). By 1861 the punt had stopped operating. It was probably put out of business when the Penny Bridge was constructed from Church Street to the Park in 1857. According to a letter to the Argus the Punt was still operating in 1856 but a coronial inquest reported in the Argus of 1859 said the body had been found 'near where the old Hodgson's Punt crossed the river.'

Residences

Hodgson owned land between Flinders Lane, Queen and Flinders Streets - one and half of Hoddle's 'allotments' in section 1 of the new city. He built an 'ambitious' residence known as 'Hodgson's Folly'. 'It was for some time a centre of the social life of the young town, but when its owner decided to go farther afield to the pleasant riverside atmosphere of Studley Park, where he built a new home, it became a boarding establishment for young women'.

His own advertisement in 1840 called 'Yarra House' a 'splendid Mansion, finished in every part in a very superior and substantial manner, containing numerous entertaining rooms of large dimensions, the bedrooms, offices, and cellars are very complete, in all twenty six rooms... The garden achieved colonial fame. The Sydney Herald and the Hobart Town Courier and Van Diemen's Land Gazette both carried reports of a  cucumber grown by his gardener. The newly formed Port Phillip Club rented the building in 1840 for £600 a year.  Hodgson put the 'elegant house' up for auction in February 1841, and it was 'bought in at' £3,700.

There is some uncertainty about the 'new home by the river'. One reference says that 'The site of the former St Heliers Convent was originally purchased ...by Major Henry Smyth of Sydney in 1838, and leased to John Hodgson.' Another reference says 'One of these riverside allotments was purchased by Edward Curr, who built a house on the site, and named it St Helier.'  The Colonial Times report referred to above suggests that Hodgson built St Helier only to become insolvent. Kerr's Melbourne Almanac and Port Phillip Directory for 1841 has his address as 'St Helier's Yarra Yarra, Melbourne'.

This is supported by the Port Phillip Herald 28 January 1842 which reported 'Mr Hodgson's beautiful property (35 acres) on the Yarra, known as 'St Hillier' was sold by the Sheriff on Tuesday for £1160, subject to a mortgage of £1100. The garden is known as the prettiest within many miles of town.'

In the 1847 Directory Hodgson's entry reads 'Hodgson John: settler: Studley: Yarra Yarra'. Hodgson provided various addresses in public advertisements in the Argus, including the Melbourne Club and Bank Place. On 3 June 1852 from the Bank Place address he advertised for rent a "large and substantial Home, suitable for a Public House, one mile from Melbourne".

Hodgson built what became known as Studley House in 1857 in Nolan Avenue Kew. The original house is symmetrical with a double storeyed colonnade of ionic on Tuscan orders supporting a parapet with urns. The net asset value was £200. The house was added to by the squatter James McEvoy, who bought it on Hodgson's death. John Wren, who bought the property in 1902, also added substantially to the house. It is now part of Xavier College. Photos The house is on the National Estate. National Estate listing.

Public life
Hodgson began his career as a politician on Tuesday 21 May 1850 at the Imperial Inn when Councillor Armitstead, who had resigned short of his full term, nominated Hodgson to succeed him as a Councillor for Lonsdale ward in the south west of the city for the balance of his term. Based on a show of hands by those present the other candidate was declared elected by the Mayor, who was presiding over the Alderman's Court. Hodgson exercised his right to ask for a poll, which was held the next day. The poll opened at 9 am and, as was the practice, the vote was declared every hour. Hodgson was level at 11 am and then drew ahead, holding 127 votes to 82 when the poll closed at 4 pm.

Hodgson and his Committee campaigned energetically, whereas the other candidate's campaign was described by the Argus as "apathetic and listless". One hundred fifty-six electors chose not to vote; the Argus called it a "pygmy contest" and "a very tame and spiritless affair, and the stake so small as to be hardly worth playing for seriously, presenting only the not very tempting bait of a seat in the City Council for the short period of five months".  Hodgson was declared elected the next day, and shortly after elected to the Public Works and Finance Committees of the City Council. Five months later at the Council elections, Hodgson proved the Argus wrong. No other candidate stood against him, and he was declared elected as a Councillor for a full term.

His recorded interventions as a new Councillor relate to his Committee roles, seconding motions on sewerage, clean water and the Surveyor's salary. He revealed some of his views by taking a strong stand against the pro-transportation and anti Port Phillip opinions expressed by William Wentworth.

In 1851 Hodgson ran for a seat in the new Victorian Legislative Council. The Argus was not amused: "The next most objectionable man amongst the candidates for the representation of Melbourne, is Councillor Hodgson. Second only in unfitness, for so great a public trust, to the slippery Doctor, Councillor Hodgson has so few of the requisites for a leading public man, that for a long time we could not believe him serious in aiming at such a distinction. Of his political principle's we think pretty nearly as humbly as we do of his capacity ... he appears to court popularity by trying to conciliate all; and he therefore becomes, what all such men are apt to become, something very like a trimmer."

As the election drew close it appeared that Hodgson could beat William Westgarth. The Argus wrote:
 Hodgson's candidacy did not survive this opposition, and he was not elected, he finished fourth in the poll, the first three were elected to Council.

It may have been some consolation that on 11 November 1851 Hodgson was elected Alderman, or senior Councillor, in his ward. Later, however, on 8 June 1853 Hodgson was elected to the City of Melbourne as one of the three additional members in the expansion of the unicameral Legislative Council and was sworn-in two months later. Hodgson held this seat until March 1856. When the new Legislative Council (the upper house of the new Parliament) was created in November 1856, Hodgson was elected a member for Central Province, a seat he held until August 1860.

Other interests

Hodgson had a continuing interest in the City's developing infrastructure.

As early as 1846 he is noted in the Argus as proposing "a timber bridge across the Yarra Yarra, in the vicinity of Mr. Simpson's residence". Simpson was the well respected first "arbitrator" (1836) and later following Lonsdale, the second police magistrate of the new colony. Throughout the 1840s Simpson lived in Little Flinders Street.

He was a member of the Victorian Institute for the Advancement of Science 1854, the Philosophical Institute of Victoria 1855, 1857–9 and the Royal Society of Victoria
1860. Royal Society

He helped establish the Burke and Wills expedition. At a public meeting in the Mechanics Institute in Collins Street, Hodgson with six others formed the Exploration Fund Raising Committee in August 1958. In January 1860, with its work done, the EFRC was dissolved, and the Royal Society of Victoria formed an Exploration Committee, of which Hodgson became Vice Chair on 25 January 1860. Hodgson attended his last committee meeting on 23 July 1860, ten days before he died, and a couple of weeks before Burke and Willis left Melbourne on 20 August.

Hodgson seconded the motion to establish "a Loyal Joint Stock Bank, to be called the Bank of Victoria", and served on the Provisional Committee to establish the Bank. An Act of the Legislative Council established the Bank in 1852. The Bank operated until 1927 when it merged with the Commercial Banking Company of Sydney which itself became part of the National Australia Bank in 1981.

Hodgson attended a public meeting that aimed to take preliminary steps for the formation of "a Coal Company for the working of the coal known to exist at Western Port".

References

1799 births
1860 deaths
Mayors and Lord Mayors of Melbourne
Members of the Victorian Legislative Council
People from the Metropolitan Borough of Doncaster
19th-century Australian politicians
English emigrants to colonial Australia